HD 103197 b (also known as HIP 57931 b) is an extrasolar planet which orbits the K-type main sequence star HD 103197, located approximately 170 light years away. It is outside of the habitable zone, and as such is unlikely to have liquid water on its moons, if there are any.

References 

Exoplanets discovered in 2009
Exoplanets detected by radial velocity
Giant planets
Centaurus (constellation)